Tienfala is a small town and commune on the Niger River in the Cercle of Koulikoro in the Koulikoro Region of south-western Mali. As of 1998 the commune had a population of 4128. 
It is located 30 kilometres from Bamako.

References

Communes of Koulikoro Region
Communities on the Niger River